Viburnum dentatum, southern arrowwood or arrowwood viburnum or roughish arrowwood, is a small shrub, native to the eastern United States and Canada from Maine south to northern Florida and eastern Texas.

Like most Viburnum, it has opposite, simple leaves and fruit in berry-like drupes. Foliage turns yellow to red in late fall.  Localized variations of the species are common over its entire geographic range.  Common differences include leaf size and shape and placement of pubescence on leaf undersides and petioles.

Some moth larvae feed on V. dentatum. Known such species include the unsated sallow (or arrowwood sallow; Metaxaglaea inulta) and Phyllonorycter viburnella. It is also consumed by the viburnum leaf beetle (Pyrrhalta viburni), an invasive species from Eurasia. The fruits are a food source for songbirds. Berries contain 41.3% fat.

The fruits appear blue. The major pigments are cyanidin 3-glucoside, cyanidin 3-sambubioside, and cyanidin 3-vicianoside, but the total mixture is very complex.

Native Americans used the young stems to make arrow shafts.

Varieties 
Viburnum dentatum var. deamii 
Viburnum dentatum var. dentatum
Viburnum dentatum var. lucidum  – currently considered a separate species; Viburnum recognitum, the northern arrowwood, or smooth arrowwood
Viburnum dentatum var. venosum

References

External links 

dentatum
Flora of the Northeastern United States
Plants described in 1753
Taxa named by Carl Linnaeus
Flora of the Southeastern United States
Flora of the North-Central United States
Flora of Texas